Billy Livsey is an American songwriter, keyboardist, and producer originally from St. Louis, Missouri and now resides in Nashville, Tennessee. He has worked with many musicians including Tina Turner, Kevin Ayers, Phil Manzanera, 801, Gerry Rafferty, Five Star, Gallagher and Lyle, Ronnie Lane,  Kenny Rogers, and Rodney Crowell. Livsey played the keyboard solo on Tina Turner's "What's Love Got to Do with It", and keyboards on "Breakaway" and "Heart on My Sleeve" for Gallagher and Lyle, and on "How Come" for Ronnie Lane. Livsey founded his own publishing company called Quince Music Ltd. in the 1980s, and more recently, Billy Livsey Music, both of which are still active today.

Presently, Billy has a close relationship with Nashville-based recording studio Welcome to 1979 where he often works as a session keyboardist. Livsey also houses a large portion of his collection of vintage synths, keyboards, and electric pianos at the studio. At Welcome to 1979 Billy has worked on sessions with a variety of artists like Pete Townshend, Brendan Benson, and The Outer Vibe.

Billy wrote the UK number 2 hit "Rain Or Shine" and the number 3 hit "System Addict", both by Five Star, and the UK number 11 hit "Give Me Your Heart Tonight" by Shakin' Stevens.

Quince Music Cuts 
1) "System Addict" (Five Star)

2)"You Belong To Me" (Anita Baker)

3) "Rain or Shine" (Five Star)

4) "Give Me Your Heart Tonight" (Shakin’ Stevens)

5) "Our Love" (Elkie Brooks)

6) "No One Can Love You More Than Me" (Melissa Manchester, The Weather Girls)

7) "Button Off My Shirt" (Ronnie Milsap, Paul Carrick)

8) "Are You Man Enough" (Sheena Easton)

9) "She’s Trouble" (Musical Youth)

10) "Bite the Hand That Feeds" (Paul Young)

References

Billy Livsey discography

American keyboardists
American country songwriters
American male songwriters
Living people
Year of birth missing (living people)
Musicians from Nashville, Tennessee
Musicians from Tennessee
Songwriters from Tennessee
American expatriates in the United Kingdom